The Neoplan N4016 was a low-floor single-decker bus built by Neoplan between 1988 and 1999, initially at Stuttgart in Germany and later also in Poland. It is the larger version of the Neoplan N4009 midibus.

The N4016 is remembered for being the first low-entry single-decker bus sold in the United Kingdom.

While the MAZ-101 sold poorly, subsequent variants (and the three-axle ) have been sold to a vast amount of Belarusian, Russian and foreign operators and are still in production today.

Specifications
The N4016 was 12m long and 2.5m wide, and is powered by a MAN or DAF engine with Voith or ZF Friedrichshafen transmission. The N4016 typically seated 31 or 39 with a large standing capacity. Some interesting features that it has a double-curvature windscreen, a separately mounted destination sign and a rounded roof dome that is more rounded than the existing Centroliner that is slightly different from the existing Centroliner.

Service

United Kingdom
Twelve N4016s were sold in the United Kingdom, all to the Merseyside Passenger Transport Executive.

Europe

Athens-based bus operator, OAS, purchased 93 Neoplan N4016s in 1994. All of them were retired in 2009 and have since been abandoned in a vacant lot in Ano Liosia.

Poznań-based tram and bus operator, Miejskie Przedsiębiorstwo Komunikacyjne w Poznaniu, purchased 32 Neoplan N4016s between 1996 and 1999. The last Neoplan N4016s were withdrawn in 2014.

References

External links

Full-size buses
Low-floor buses
Midibuses
N4016
Vehicles introduced in 1988